Wasatch Mountain is a  mountain in the San Miguel Mountains in San Miguel County, Colorado, United States.

Description
It is part of the San Juan Mountains, which are a subset of the Rocky Mountains, and ranks as the 214th-highest peak in Colorado. The mountain's name, which has been officially adopted by the United States Board on Geographic Names, was in use in 1906 when Henry Gannett published it in the Gazetteer of Colorado.

Climate
According to the Köppen climate classification system, Wasatch Mountain is located in an alpine subarctic climate zone with long, cold, snowy winters, and cool to warm summers. Due to its altitude, it receives precipitation all year, as snow in winter, and as thunderstorms in summer, with a dry period in late spring. Precipitation runoff from the mountain drains into tributaries of the San Miguel River.

See also

 List of mountains in Colorado

References

External links

 Weather forecast: Wasatch Mountain

Mountains of San Miguel County, Colorado
San Juan Mountains (Colorado)
Mountains of Colorado
North American 4000 m summits
Uncompahgre National Forest